Crocydopora is a monotypic snout moth genus described by Edward Meyrick in 1882. Its single species, Crocydopora cinigerella, described by Francis Walker in 1866 is known from Australia and New Zealand.

References

Phycitini
Monotypic moth genera
Moths of Australia
Moths of New Zealand
Pyralidae genera